The BMW M335 is a straight-6 OHV petrol engine which was produced from 1939–1941. It was used in the BMW 335 sedans and convertibles, and was the most powerful BMW engine prior to World War II.

Compared with its M328 predecessor, the M335 has a displacement increase of 77%. As per the M328, the M335 has an iron block and aluminium cylinder head.

Production of the M335 was cut short due to World War II. Although the M335 does not have a direct successor, in 1954 its place as the high-performance engine was filled by the BMW OHV V8.


Versions

M335 
Fuel is supplied by a single Solex 35 carburetor. The engine produces  at 3,000 rpm.

Applications:
 1939-1941 BMW 335

References 

BMW engines
Straight-six engines
Gasoline engines by model